Cedeira is a municipality in the province of A Coruña in the autonomous community of Galicia in northwestern Spain. It is situated in the northern coast of the Rías Altas. Cedeira has a population of 7,412 inhabitants (INE, 2010).

Parroquias
Cedeira (Santa María do Mar)
Cervo (Santalla)
Esteiro (San Fiz)
Montoxo (San Xiao)
Piñeiro (San Cosme)
Régoa (Santa María)
San Román de Montoxo (San Román)

Demography  
From:INE Archiv

Politics

Economy

Travelers from Cedeira travel to South Africa, Terranova in Canada or the Irish Box to fish. Most of the fish, mainly tuna, is canned and stored in warehouses locally for later distribution to different parts of Spain and Europe.

Farming, horse breeding and timber production, together with services are the main economic activities. Since the late 1980s Cedeira has developed into a coastal resort.

Wind-mill parks are common in Ferrolterra, particularly in the boroughs of Cariño, Cedeira and A Capela.

Santo André de Teixido
Nearby is the site of Santo André (or San Andres), a pre-Christian pilgrimage site, with a holy well. Parts of the chapel at San Andres dates from the 12th century, although most of the structure was designed by Miguel Lopez de la Peña and built in 1789. The earliest reference to Christian pilgrimage there comes from a 1391 manuscript, in which a woman from nearby Viveiro says:

Iten mando yr por min en romaria yr per min a Santo Andre of Teixido, porque Ilo tenno prometudo, tenno, et que le ponnan enno seu altar hua candea commo he hua muller de meu estado

The cliffs of San Andres are described as the highest in Europe.

Culture
Cedeira hosts a small Medieval Fair in one of its main squares each year. In addition, the gastronomical "Percebe" (barnacle) festival is held in July.

References

Municipalities in the Province of A Coruña
Port cities and towns on the Spanish Atlantic coast